Otay may refer to:

Locations
Otay Centenario
Otay Mesa, San Diego
Otay Mesa Port of Entry
Otay Mesa West, San Diego
Otay Ranch High School
Otay Ranch Town Center
Otay River
Lower Otay Reservoir
Rancho Otay

See also
 Otey (disambiguation)